Gamora is a fictional character portrayed primarily by Zoe Saldaña in the Marvel Cinematic Universe (MCU) media franchise, based on the Marvel Comics character of the same name. Gamora is depicted as a member of the Guardians of the Galaxy, having escaped her previous life as an assassin after she was forcibly adopted by Thanos after he eliminated half of her planet's race, including her mother. For the next twenty years, she served Thanos as a cybernetically enhanced warrior, until betraying him to join the Guardians. Over time she becomes romantically involved with Peter Quill, and develops a positive relationship with her adopted sister Nebula despite their rivalrous upbringing. She is eventually killed by Thanos when he sacrifices her on Vormir to obtain the Soul Stone. When the Avengers use time travel in an effort to undo Thanos' actions, an alternate 2014-Gamora accompanies 2014-Thanos to confront the Avengers in 2023 after he hijacks their technology. However, upon being convinced by the alternate 2023 version of her adopted sister, she switches sides and joins the fight against her father, but disappears after his defeat.

, Gamora has appeared in four films and will return in the upcoming film Guardians of the Galaxy Vol. 3 (2023). The character and Saldaña's portrayal have been met with positive reception.

Alternate versions of Gamora from within the MCU multiverse appear in Avengers: Endgame (2019) and in the animated series What If...? (2021). One version, voiced by Cynthia McWilliams, usurped Thanos's warlord position and is recruited into the Guardians of the Multiverse by the Watcher to help defeat an alternate version of Ultron.

Concept and creation
Gamora debuted as a comic book character in Strange Tales #180 (1975), and was created by Jim Starlin. She returned in issue #181, Warlock vol. 1 #9, 10, 11 and 15 (1975–1976), and in the 1977 annuals for Avengers and Marvel Two-in-One. In 1990, she returned in Silver Surfer vol. 3 #46–47. She had a minor role in Infinity Gauntlet #1–6 (1991) and co-starred in Warlock and the Infinity Watch #1–42 (1992–1995).  She was also featured in the Infinity War (1992) and Infinity Crusade (1993) crossovers. After appearing in Infinity Abyss #1–6 (2002), Annihilation: Ronan #1–4 (2006), Annihilation #1–6 (2006), Annihilation: Conquest #6 (2008) and Nova vol. 4 #4–12 (2007–2008), Gamora costarred in Guardians of the Galaxy vol. 2 #1–25 (2008–2010).

Marvel Studios President Kevin Feige first mentioned Guardians of the Galaxy as a potential film at the 2010 San Diego Comic-Con International, stating, "There are some obscure titles, too, like Guardians of the Galaxy. I think they've been revamped recently in a fun way in the [comic] book." Feige reiterated that sentiment in a September 2011 issue of Entertainment Weekly, saying, "There's an opportunity to do a big space epic, which Thor sort of hints at, in the cosmic side" of the Marvel Cinematic Universe. Feige added, should the film be made, it would feature an ensemble of characters, similar to X-Men and The Avengers. Feige announced that the film was in active development at the 2012 San Diego Comic-Con International during the Marvel Studios panel, with an intended release date of August 1, 2014. He said the film's titular team would consist of the characters Star-Lord, Gamora, Drax the Destroyer, Groot, and Rocket.

In early April 2013, Zoe Saldaña entered into negotiations to star as Gamora in the film, and it was confirmed she had been cast later that month. Amanda Seyfried had been offered the role, but declined due to the excessive hours of make-up required for the role, and her uncertainty over the film's commercial viability.

Fictional character biography

Early life
As a child, Gamora's planet was invaded by Thanos, whose forces killed half the population, including her parents. Gamora confronted him, who admired her courage in doing so, with Thanos adopting her as his daughter. She was trained as an assassin, and raised alongside Nebula, whom she was often pitted against in fights, in which Gamora always won.

Joining the Guardian of the Galaxy

Gamora plans to rebel against Thanos when he sends her to aid Ronan the Accuser, a Kree fanatic who wants to destroy the planet Xandar. She travels to Xandar to retrieve an Infinity Stone that has been acquired by Peter Quill in order to sell it for enough money to afford to live the rest of her life. Due to the interference of bounty hunters Rocket and Groot, she is instead captured by Xandar's law enforcement, the Nova Corps, and sent to a space prison called the Kyln, along with Quill, Rocket and Groot. There, she is threatened by Drax the Destroyer, whose family was killed by Ronan under the command of Thanos, but Drax spares her life when Quill assures him that her presence will draw Ronan to them. Gamora joins Quill, Rocket, Groot, and Drax in escaping the prison. The group form the Guardians of the Galaxy and travel to Knowhere, where Gamora meets with the Collector. After being attacked by Nebula, Gamora and the Guardians are able to save Xandar from Ronan. Because of her heroic actions, Gamora is cleared of her previous crimes.

Stopping Ego
Some months later, Gamora and the Guardians are hired by the Sovereign to fight off an alien attacking their valuable batteries, in exchange for a captured Nebula. After they leave, they are chased by the Sovereign's fleet after Rocket reveals that he stole some of the batteries. Crash landing on a planet, they meet Quill's father, Ego. Gamora, Quill, and Drax decide to go with Ego to his planet, while Rocket, Groot, and Nebula stay behind. On Ego's planet, they meet Ego's assistant Mantis, and Gamora and Quill begin a romantic relationship. While exploring the planet, Gamora is attacked by an escaped Nebula. After Gamora saves Nebula from her burning spaceship, the two sisters reconcile. They meet up with the Guardians and find out about Ego's true evil plans. She and Nebula then help each other get to safety while escaping the planet, and once in space, she and Nebula say their goodbyes, after Nebula tells her that she's going after Thanos.

Infinity War and death

Four years later, Gamora and the Guardians respond to a distress signal in space and end up rescuing Thor from his destroyed spacecraft, thereby learning about Thanos's quest to obtain the Infinity Stones. Gamora grimly tells Quill that she knows something Thanos does not and asks him to kill her if needed. On Knowhere, Gamora, Quill, Mantis, and Drax see Thanos, and Gamora immediately attacks him, seemingly killing him. However, Thanos reveals himself, showing her that Knowhere is destroyed and that he already has the Reality Stone. After a failed attempt to kill her by Quill, Thanos kidnaps her and takes her upon his spaceship. He shows her a captured and tortured Nebula to emotionally manipulate Gamora into revealing the location of the Soul Stone. Thanos and Gamora go to the planet Vormir where they are met by the Red Skull who tells them that to obtain the Soul Stone, one must sacrifice what they love. Thanos admits that he truly loves Gamora as his daughter, and tearfully throws her off the cliff to her death. When Thanos later uses the completed Infinity Gauntlet, he briefly reunites with a younger Gamora inside the Soul World.

Alternate versions

Battle of Earth 

In an alternate 2014, Gamora and Nebula are summoned by Thanos, who orders them to assist Ronan in obtaining the Power Stone. Before they can leave, however, Nebula begins to malfunction due to the presence of the time-traveling 2023 Nebula. After capturing 2023-Nebula, Thanos analyzes her memories and learns about his deceased 2018 self's victory. Gamora is then brought through the Quantum Realm to the current timeline and is recruited by the current Nebula to join her side. They find 2014-Nebula in the destroyed Avengers Compound and try to convince her to abandon Thanos. However, she refuses, and is killed by the current Nebula. Gamora then joins her in participating in the battle alongside the restored Avengers and 2023-Nebula's Guardians of the Galaxy. During the battle, Gamora encounters Quill, but not knowing who he is, knocks him down. After the battle is over, she leaves the battlefield.

What If...?

Several alternate versions of Gamora appear in the animated series What If...?, in which she is voiced by Cynthia McWilliams.

Ultron's conquest

In an alternate 2015, Gamora, along with the other Guardians of the Galaxy, is killed while defending the Sovereign from Ultron.

Destroyer of Thanos

In another universe, Gamora kills Thanos, seizes his armor and sword, assumes his position as a warlord, befriends Tony Stark, and becomes a champion on Sakaar.

While traveling to Nidavellir with Stark, she is recruited by the Watcher to join the Guardians of the Multiverse to help stop Ultron. The Guardians devise a plan to destroy Ultron's Infinity Stones using the Infinity Crusher, only to discover that the Crusher does not work outside of Gamora's reality. After Ultron is eventually defeated, the Watcher returns Gamora to her universe, where she resumes her travels with Stark.

Characterization
Gamora is an orphan from an alien world who seeks redemption for her past crimes. She was trained by Thanos to be his personal assassin. Saldaña said that she became Gamora through make-up rather than computer-generated imagery (CGI) or performance capture. On taking the role, Saldaña said, "I was just excited to be asked to join by James Gunn and to also play someone green. I've been blue before [in Avatar]." Saldaña described Gamora as "a warrior, she's an assassin and she's very lethal, but what saves her is the same thing that can doom her. She has a sense of righteousness. She's a very righteous individual."

She appears as a member of the original Guardians of the Galaxy, eventually finding love with Peter Quill as seen in Guardians of the Galaxy and Guardians of the Galaxy: Vol. 2. Saldaña described Gamora's role in Vol. 2, as the team's "the voice of reason", saying, "She's surrounded by all these dudes who are so stupid half the time," and added that she is the "Mom" of the team, saying that she is "just a meticulous, detailed, professional individual." Regarding Gamora's relationship with Nebula, Saldaña described it as "volatile" and added, "we're starting somewhere very crazy but appropriate given where we had ended things off in the first installment".

In Avengers: Infinity War, Gamora is still in a relationship with Quill. She is captured by Thanos and taken to Vormir where she is killed so Thanos can receive the Soul Stone. Ariana Greenblatt portrays a young Gamora in Infinity War in a flashback, as well as when she is with Thanos in the Soul Stone's "Soul World".

Reception
Zoe Saldaña has received numerous award nominations for her portrayal of the character.

See also
 Characters of the Marvel Cinematic Universe
 Gamora

Notes

References

External links
 Gamora on the Marvel Cinematic Universe Wiki
 
 Gamora on Marvel.com

Avengers (film series)
Female characters in film
Fictional characters displaced in time
Fictional female assassins
Fictional humanoids
Fictional mercenaries
Fictional murdered people
Fictional outlaws
Fictional prison escapees
Fictional characters with superhuman durability or invulnerability
Fictional swordfighters in films
Fictional women soldiers and warriors
Film characters introduced in 2014
Guardians of the Galaxy (film series)
Guardians of the Galaxy characters
Marvel Cinematic Universe characters
Marvel Comics characters with accelerated healing
Marvel Comics characters with superhuman strength
Marvel Comics extraterrestrial superheroes
Marvel Comics female superheroes
Marvel Comics orphans
Orphan characters in film
Space pirates
Superheroes who are adopted